The February 2022 North American winter storm was a widespread, damaging, and severe winter storm which affected a wide swath of much of the United States with widespread wintry precipitation; it spread from Texas northeast to Maine. Nineteen states in the U.S. were impacted by the system; more than 90 million people were in the storm's path. The winter storm was  named Winter Storm Landon by The Weather Channel and was also referred to by other media outlets as the Groundhog Snowstorm, primarily due to the storm impacting on Groundhog Day.

The storm spread a widespread swath of heavy snowfall stretching from Texas to Maine, with anywhere from  falling. It also caused many disruptions as well, with over 375,000 people losing power as a result of the storm and many accidents occurring on snowy roadways as well. 7 deaths were attributed to the winter storm's impacts. Five tornadoes also occurred within the warm sector of the storm in Alabama on February 3; three of them were rated EF2.

Meteorological history
Over much of the Midwest, temperatures were unseasonably mild on February 1 as a strong cold front moved southward over the region. Rain began to fall in the early afternoon over the Central Midwest, and temperatures began to drop as the front draped southward. During the early evening, an upper-level low began to form along the front and interacted with a jet streak producing lift. As the temperatures on the backside of the front cooled and fell below freezing, the rain quickly turned to snow and thanks to the lift, made perfect conditions for lots of snow with rates receiving 1" an hour in some places. The winds also picked up to 30–35mph causing many cases of blowing and drifting snow. This snow continued through the night with areas along and south of I-70 in Missouri and Indiana receiving more of a wintry mix and rain.

During the night and morning of February 2, a second upper-level low began to form over Texas. Snow accumulations occurred in areas west of I-35 while areas east received freezing rain and sleet. This system also began to advance northeastward along the cold front. Meanwhile, the first system also continued northeast and by the late-morning moved out of the Western Midwest and by the afternoon moved out of the rest of the area and into the northeast. But during the night, the second system moved back over the same area as the first bringing yet another round of snow to many of the same regions while areas in Arkansas and along the Ohio River Valley received heavy freezing rain and sleet.

The energy from the two systems began to merge over the northeast during the morning on Thursday, February 3. By this time the system had become so large that precipitation associated with the system was falling over nearly half of all the US states, from Texas to Maine, but with the bulk of it still over Texas and Arkansas. During the late morning this would shift to over the Ohio River Valley while snow began to become heavier in the northeast and moisture being pulled northward by the system would cause a small severe weather outbreak over Alabama. The storm continued to move northeast and by that night was over mainly the Northeast. Snow would continue through the day on Friday, February 4 before the bulk of the storm moved offshore in the early afternoon. It would reach a minimum pressure of  around this time as well.

Preparations
The National Weather Service issued winter storm watches from Wyoming to Maine. Winter Storm Warnings were also issued from New Mexico to Maine, and at least 18 states were under winter storm warnings. In northeastern Ohio, and Buffalo, New York, snow amounts of more than a foot were forecasted. Amtrak cancelled or modified the routes several trains due to the storm. In Phoenix Sky Harbor International Airport, 103 flights were cancelled and 82 were delayed.

United States

Deep South
Early on February 3, a tornado watch was issued by the Storm Prediction Center (SPC) for portions of Alabama and Mississippi. Additional flood watches were issued for portions of Alabama, Kentucky, Tennessee, and Georgia. The Texas Department of Transportation (TxDot) stated that crews will work on bridges and roads in response to the storm. On February 1, the University of Oklahoma closed campus for February 2–3.

Midwest

A state of emergency was declared in Missouri, Illinois, and Kentucky, as well as 50 National Guard troops being deployed in Indiana to assist stranded motorists. The University of Missouri moved to online classes for February 2–3. Many schools closed and moved to online classes in preparation for the storm.
More than 3,000 flights were canceled, mainly airlines headed to Midwestern airports, and all airlines headed to St. Louis, Missouri were all canceled. In Michigan, buses, trains, and flights were all delayed, and some were canceled. The Gateway Arch National Park closed on February 2 due to the storm. Ohio State canceled classes for February 3. In Allen County, Indiana (City of Fort Wayne, Indiana) a snow emergency and travel warning was put in place to keep drivers off the roads. Reports of over an inch an hour were falling at that time, and those same conditions occurred in Indianapolis and Bloomington.

Northeast
More than 600 flights were canceled to Northeastern U.S. airports on Wednesday in preparation of the winter storm. Cities including Burlington, Boston, and Providence issued snow emergencies due to the upcoming winter storm.

Mexico
Roads in Northern Mexico were closed due to the winter storm.

Impact

United States
Because of the winter storm, 5,600 flights were canceled both on February 2 and February 3.

West
South of Colorado Springs, Colorado, nearly 2 feet (61 cm) of snow was reported. In Wyoming, around 3 inches of snow was reported in Cheyenne, Wyoming. In Utah, small amounts of snow were reported in the Salt Lake City, though little to no snow was reported in other regions of Utah, with small amounts being reported in Sandy, Provo, and Vernal.

Southwest
At least 3 people were killed in New Mexico, 1 was killed in a weather–related pileup on I-40 in Bernalillo County, New Mexico, and 2 were killed when their car rolled  down a mountain near Cedar Crest. An additional non–fatal tractor–trailer accident closed I-25 near Santa Fe.

Deep South
Due to wintry conditions across Dallas, Texas, Dallas/Fort Worth International Airport was closed on February 3. One person was killed in Dallas, when a semi-truck crashed while traveling on I-45 while traveling over I-30, an additional dog died in the crash as well. Three inches of snow were reported in Nashville, Tennessee, as well as 2 additional inches in Little Rock, Arkansas and Mayfield, Kentucky. Over 120,000 people lost power in Shelby County, Tennessee, and it took nearly two weeks for power to be restored. On I-10 near Kerrville, Texas, several semi-trucks were jackknifed, causing drivers to be stranded on the interstate for hours. A truck driver died on I-35 in Oklahoma after losing control on an icy part of the road.  A person in Oklahoma died after crashing in an ATV on a snow-covered road. Ice impacts reached as far south as Corpus Christi, Texas.

Alabama 

On the morning of February 3, the Storm Prediction Center (SPC) issued a slight risk for tornadoes for portions of Mississippi and Alabama. The storm system spawned a supercell that produced three EF2 tornadoes in Western Alabama, the second of which struck areas near Sawyerville and caused significant high-end EF2 damage. One person was killed and eight others were injured, including three seriously. Two additional tornadoes, both rated EF0, impacted Elmore County as well, resulting in minimal damage. The National Weather Service issued a particularly dangerous situation on the tornado warning for Sawyerville. The tornado damaged 60 homes and destroyed 20 others.

Midwest
In Missouri, I-70, I-44, and I=72 were all covered with snow and ice. In Illinois, a stretch of I-55 was closed due to motor accidents reported in the area, and parts of I-74 and I-57 also closed in Illinois. In Lewistown, Illinois, at least 14.4 inches (36.6 cm) of snow fell. Snow accumulated as high as 17 inches (44 cm) was reported in Columbia City, Indiana. A "weather-related" fatality occurred in Tennessee on February 4. There were also over 85,000 power outages in Ohio. Milwaukee, Wisconsin was “blitzed” by small amounts of snow and Madison, Wisconsin was also briefly affected. As far down as Kansas saw snow and ice, specifically in the Kansas City and Topeka areas.

Northeast 
Large amounts of rain were reported in Connecticut and Rhode Island. Snow was reported in Albany, New York and over 17 inches (44 cm) was reported in areas of Vermont, Massachusetts, and Maine, specifically the areas of Burlington and Bangor. New York also recorded over 50,000 power outages. Hundreds of flights were delayed at both LaGuardia Airport and John F. Kennedy International Airport, although Long Island MacArthur Airport did not experience significant issues.

Canada

Nova Scotia 
After the winter storm exited to sea, Southern Nova Scotia saw small amounts of snow before the winter storm began moving northeast into the sea toward Greenland.

Greenland and Iceland 
Greenland was briefly affected by the winter storm, though no major damage was reported due to the system dissipating a few hours later. Similar to Greenland, the remnants of the winter storm dropped snow in Iceland.

See also

 Weather of 2022
 List of North American tornadoes and tornado outbreaks
 February 13–17, 2021 North American winter storm
 February 15–20, 2021 North American winter storm

References

February 2022 storm
2022 natural disasters in the United States
2022 meteorology
February 2022 events in the United States
February 2022 events in Canada
Nor'easters
Ice storms in the United States